"Nervous" is a song by Canadian singer Shawn Mendes. It was written by Mendes, Scott Harris and Julia Michaels. It was produced by Teddy Geiger and Mendes. The song was released by Island Records on May 23, 2018, as the fifth single from Mendes' self-titled third studio album.

Release
Mendes announced the released of the single on May 22, 2018, by posting its artwork and release date on his Instagram account.

Music video
The music video was released on June 11, 2018, via the singer's official Vevo channel on YouTube. Lilliya Scarlett stars in the video.

Personnel
Credits adapted from Tidal.
 Shawn Mendes – production, vocals, background vocals, guitar
 Teddy Geiger – production, keyboard, drums, guitar, percussion, programming
 Harry Burr – mixing assistance
 Nate Mercereau – bass
 Scott Harris – guitar, claps
 Andrew Maury – mixing

Charts

Certifications

References

2018 songs
2018 singles
Island Records singles
Shawn Mendes songs
Songs written by Julia Michaels
Songs written by Scott Harris (songwriter)
Songs written by Shawn Mendes